Eudasychira ampliata is a tussock moth from Madagascar, first described by Arthur Gardiner Butler in 1878, and formerly placed in its own genus, Vietteria.

References

Lymantriinae